Agononida imitata is a species of squat lobster in the family Munididae. The species name is derived from the Latin word imitatus, meaning "copy" or "mimic," which is in reference to its similarity to Agononida soelae.

References

Squat lobsters
Crustaceans described in 2006